Acadia Parish is a parish located in the U.S. state of Louisiana. At the 2020 U.S. census, the population was 57,576. The parish seat is Crowley. The parish was founded from parts of St. Landry Parish in 1886, and later an election was held to determine the parish seat, ending when Crowley beat Rayne and Prairie Hayes. Acadia Parish is included in the Lafayette metropolitan statistical area.

History
The name of the parish is derived from the former French colony of Acadia in Canada (which consisted of the modern provinces of Nova Scotia, Prince Edward Island, New Brunswick, and much of Maine), many of whose French-speaking inhabitants were deported to France and then migrated to Louisiana in the Great Upheaval (see Cajuns).

The parish itself was formed from the southwestern portion of St. Landry Parish. On Wednesday May 19, 1886, a bill was introduced in the house entitled "An act to create the parish of Nicholls, and to provide for the organization thereof." The title was later changed to read: "An act to create the parish of Acadia." Father Joseph Anthonioz, the first pastor of the Catholic Church at Rayne, is credited with having suggested the name, Acadia Parish. The bill passed the house on June 11, the senate on June 28, and was approved by Governor Samuel D. McEnery on June 30. On October 6, an election was held to affirm the creation of the parish, with 2,516 votes for and 1,521 votes against the creation. The population of the new parish was from 10,000 to 12,000. Acadia Parish population in 1890 was 13,231.

After a close election held on March 1, 1887, Crowley was chosen as the parish seat, gathering 698 votes to Rayne's and Prairie Hayes' 560 and 519, respectively. The election also determined the first officers in the parish: Elridge W. Lyons, first sheriff of Acadia, and R. T. Clark, first clerk of court. The first courthouse was therefore constructed in Crowley and completed on June 30, 1888, and continued to be used until May 1, 1902, when it was destroyed to make way for the second building.

Geography

Major highways
  Interstate 10
  U.S. Highway 90
  Louisiana Highway 13
  Louisiana Highway 35
  Louisiana Highway 91
  Louisiana Highway 92
  Louisiana Highway 97

Adjacent parishes
 Evangeline Parish (north)
 St. Landry Parish (northeast)
 Lafayette Parish (east)
 Vermilion Parish (south)
 Jefferson Davis Parish (west)

Communities

Cities 
 Crowley (parish seat and largest municipality)
 Eunice
 Rayne

Towns 
 Basile
 Church Point
 Duson
 Iota

Villages 
 Estherwood
 Mermentau
 Morse

Unincorporated areas

Census-designated places 
 Branch
 Egan

Other unincorporated communities 

 Arceneaux
 Bates
 Bluff
 Castile
 Deshotel
 Ebenezer
 Ellis
 Evangeline
 Frey
 Gatte's Cove
 Gumpoint
 Hundley
 Judd
 Keystone
 LeJeune Cove
 Link
 Little Japan
 Lyons Point
 Maxie
 Mermentau Cove
 Midland
 Millerville
 Mire (formerly Marais Bouleur and Bosco)
 Mowata
 Nezpique
 Peach Bloom
 Pitreville
 Pointe Noire
 Prairie Hayes
 Prudhomme
 Richard
 Ritchie
 Robert's Cove
 Rork
 Shortbread
 Tepetate
 Tortue
 Whitehouse
 Williams

Demographics

As of the 2020 United States census, there were 57,576 people, 22,236 households, and 15,519 families residing in the parish. At the 2010 United States census, 61,773 people were residing in the parish, and 58,861 people at the 2000 United States census. In 2019, the American Community Survey estimated 62,045 people lived in the parish.

According to the 2019 American Community Survey, the racial and ethnic makeup of the parish was 77.4% non-Hispanic white, 17.4% Black and African American, 0.1% American Indian and Alaska Native, 0.1% Asian alone, 0.3% some other race, 2.8% two or more races, and 2.6% Hispanic and Latin American of any race. In 2010, 79.5% were White American, 18.1% Black and African American, 0.3% American Indian and Alaska Native, 0.6% some other race, and 1.3% of two or more races; 1.7% were Hispanic or Latin American of any race.

Among the population in 2019, 73.8% were aged 18 and older, and 14.9% aged 65 and older; 7.0% were aged 5 and under. The median age was 36.7, and 27.4% were of French heritage; 9.3% were German, 4.2% English, 4.1% Irish, 0.5% sub-Saharan African, 0.4% Scottish, 0.1% Norwegian, and 0.1% Polish in ancestry. Among the population in 2010, 43.7% were of French, French Canadian or Cajun, 10.8% American, and 8.0% German ancestry. Approximately 10% of the parish spoke a language other than English at home.

There were 22,236 households spread among 26,435 housing units. There was a home-ownership rate of 71.1% with an average of 3.31 people per household; an estimated 32% of the population living in the parish were never married, and 26.2% of households had children under the age of 18 living in them. The median gross rent was $662, and the median household value was $118,000. The median monthly cost with a mortgage was $1,083, and $312 without a mortgage.

An estimated 1,120 businesses operated in the parish, and the median household income was $43,396; the mean income was $61,465. The parish had a 52.6% employment rate, and 24.2% of the total population lived at or below the poverty line in 2019.

Arts and culture 
Many festivals and cultural celebrations are held annually in Acadia Parish, including the International Rice Festival in Crowley, Frog Festival in Rayne, and Buggy Festival in Church Point. Cajun food and music, both specialties of the local population, feature prominently in these festivals.

Several communities in Acadia Parish celebrate the tradition of Courir de Mardi Gras. Disguised with masks and costumes, Cajuns travel through their rural neighborhoods, making merry while begging for gumbo ingredients. The gumbo is the centerpiece of a communal supper and dance.

Education
Acadia Parish is served by Acadia Parish Schools.
 Acadia Parish Head Start - Church Point
 Church Point Elementary (grades PK-5) (Church Point)
 Church Point Middle (grades 6–8) (Church Point)
 Church Point High (grades 9–12) (Church Point)
 Acadia Parish Head Start - Rayne
 Central Rayne Kindergarten (grades PK-1) (Rayne)
 Martin Petitjean Elementary (grades 1–3) (Rayne)
 South Rayne Elementary (grades 4–5) (Rayne)
 Armstrong Middle (grades 6–8) (Rayne)
 Rayne High (grades 9–12) (Rayne)
 Acadia Parish Head Start - Crowley
 Crowley Kindergarten (grades PK-K) (Crowley)
 North Crowley Elementary (grades K-5) (Crowley)
 Ross Elementary (grades K-5) (Crowley)
 South Crowley Elementary (grades K-5) (Crowley)
 Crowley Middle (grades 6–8) (Crowley)
 Iota Elementary (grades PK-5) (Iota)
 Iota Middle (grades 6–8) (Iota)
 Iota High (grades 9–12) (Iota)
 Acadia Parish Head Start - Estherwood
 Branch Elementary (grades PK-8) (Branch)
 Egan Elementary (grades PK-8) (Egan)
 Estherwood Elementary (grades PK-7) (Estherwood)
 Evangeline Elementary (grades PK-8) (Evangeline)
 Mermentau Elementary (grades PK-7) (Mermentau)
 Mire Elementary (grades PK-8) (unincorporated Rayne)
 Morse Elementary (grades PK-7) (Morse)
 Richard Elementary (grades PK-8) (unincorporated Church Point)
 Crowley High (grades 9–12) (unincorporated Crowley)
 Midland High (grades 8–12) (unincorporated Midland)

Acadia Parish is also served by the Roman Catholic Diocese of Lafayette with five schools:
 St. Francis School (grades PK-8) (Iota)
 Rayne Catholic Elementary School (grades PK-8) (Rayne)
 St. Michael Elementary School (grades PK-8) (Crowley)
 Our Mother of Peace Elementary School (grades PK-8) (Church Point)
 Notre Dame High School (grades 9–12) (Crowley)

Additionally, Acadia Parish is served by one unaffiliated private school:
 Northside Christian School (grades PK-12) (Crowley)

Acadia Parish is served by two institutions of higher education:
 Louisiana State University, Eunice (Eunice)
 South Louisiana Community College service area: Acadian Campus (Crowley)

Acadia Parish Library operates branches in the parish.

National Guard
C Company 3-156TH Infantry Battalion resides in Crowley, Louisiana.  As part of the 256th IBCT, this unit deployed to Iraq twice, 2004-5 and 2010.

Politics
Historically, along with the rest of Louisiana, Acadia Parish strongly supported the Democratic Party, with support waning throughout the latter half of the 20th century. Following Bill Clinton's 1996 re-election bid, Acadia Parish has voted exclusively for Republican candidates at the presidential level.

Notable people
 Bill Cleveland, Crowley real estate developer and member of both houses of Louisiana state legislature from 1944 to 1964; defeated for third term in state senate in 1964 by Edwin Edwards
 George Stanley, sculptor for the design of the Oscar statue and the Muse Sculpture at the Hollywood Bowl
 Mary Alice Fontenot, journalist and author of children's books and books on Louisiana history
 Sidney Brown, a musician from Church Point (28 October 1906 - 6 August 1981) who was known as one of the first accordion makers and repairmen in Louisiana. Brown also has the distinction of having recorded the third-best selling Cajun music album of all-time (Noir Chaussette's "Two Step/Pestauche Taunte Na Na").
John Breaux, a retired U.S. Senator, is a native of Acadia Parish.
Edwin Edwards, a former Louisiana governor (four terms), lived and worked in Acadia Parish for many years. His political career began on the Crowley City Council.
 Tony Robichaux, former head baseball coach at University of Louisiana at Lafayette and McNeese State University

See also
 National Register of Historic Places listings in Acadia Parish, Louisiana

References

External links
 Acadia Parish Chamber of Commerce
 Acadia Parish Clerk of Court
 Acadia Parish Tourist Commission
 Acadia Parish GIS Maps
 Acadia Parish Sheriff's Office 

Geology
 Heinrich, P. V., J. Snead, and R. P. McCulloh, 2003, Crowley 30 x 60 minute geologic quadrangle. Louisiana Geological Survey, Baton Rouge, Louisiana.

{{
|titlestyle = background:#ccccff;
|title      = Presidential elections results
}}
 
Louisiana parishes
Parishes in Acadiana
1886 establishments in Louisiana
Populated places established in 1886